Vinbergs IF is a Swedish football club located in Vinberg in Falkenberg Municipality, Halland County.

Background
Vinbergs Idrottsförening is a sports club that was founded in 1932 and has specialised in football and gymnastics.  The club's most famous player is Magnus "Turbo" Svensson who played for the Swedish national team. Bandy player Magnus Svensson (who currently plays for Warberg IC) also played football for Vinbergs IF. Former volleyball player Niklas Carlsson, who played for Falkenbergs Volleybollklubb (Fvbk) and the Swedish national team, was a very talented goalkeeper with the football club.

Since their foundation Vinbergs IF has participated mainly in the middle and lower divisions of the Swedish football league system.  The club currently plays in Division 3 Sydvästra Götaland which is the fifth tier of Swedish football. The club played 4 seasons in Division 2 Södra Götaland in the 1990s.  They play their home matches at the Vinåvallen in Vinberg.

Vinbergs IF are affiliated to Hallands Fotbollförbund.

Recent history
In recent seasons Vinbergs IF have competed in the following divisions:

2011 – Division III, Sydvästra Götaland
2010 – Division IV, Halland Elit
2009 – Division IV, Halland Elit
2008 – Division IV, Halland Elit
2007 – Division IV, Halland
2006 – Division IV, Halland
2005 – Division IV, Halland
2004 – Division III, Sydvästra Götaland
2003 – Division III, Sydvästra Götaland
2002 – Division III, Sydvästra Götaland
2001 – Division III, Sydvästra Götaland
2000 – Division III, Sydvästra Götaland
1999 – Division III, Sydvästra Götaland
1998 – Division II, Södra Götaland
1997 – Division II, Södra Götaland
1996 – Division III, Sydvästra Götaland
1995 – Division III, Sydvästra Götaland
1994 – Division II, Södra Götaland
1993 – Division II, Södra Götaland

Attendances

In recent seasons Vinbergs IF have had the following average attendances:

The attendance record was set in 1991 when 3,476 spectators attended the Svenska Cupen match against Malmö FF.  The visitors won 6–1.

Footnotes

External links
 Vinbergs IF – Official website
 Vinbergs IF on Facebook

Football clubs in Halland County
Association football clubs established in 1932
1932 establishments in Sweden